Crown Estate Scotland is the self-financing public corporation of the Scottish Government responsible for the management of land and property in Scotland owned by the monarch 'in right of the Crown'. It was separated from the Crown Estate of the United Kingdom under the Scotland Act of 2016. It is responsible for a range of rural, coastal and marine assets across Scotland. The monarch remains the legal owner of these assets, but they do not form the private property of the monarch, and cannot be sold by the monarch. The primary purpose of Crown Estate Scotland is to invest in property, natural resources, and places to create lasting value for the people of Scotland. Surplus revenue (i.e. revenue profit after maintaining and enhancing the value of the estate, as per the Scottish Crown Estate Act 2019) does not belong to the monarch, but is paid to the Scottish Consolidated Fund which in turn helps finance the Scottish Government.

Crown Estate Scotland's main income source is from leases on the property, which is mostly in sectors such as offshore renewables, farming, tourism and aquaculture. The corporation is one of the largest property managers in Scotland, managing assets worth £568.2 million as of 2022. The corporation works alongside the Scottish Government, Scottish Parliament, local authorities, communities, third sector and businesses with the aim to create "lasting value for Scotland".

History
The basis for the assets now comprising the Scottish Crown Estate comes from various ancient rights, functions and assets that came to be owned by the Scottish Crown, and later the British Sovereign in Scotland. In 1790 King George III revoked his claim to the income from the crown estates in England, receiving in return an annual payment known as the civil list from the Treasury. The Crown retained the income from estates in Scotland until 1830, when under King William IV the hereditary land revenues of The Crown in Scotland  were transferred from the Barons of the Exchequer to the Commissioners of Woods, Forests, Land Revenues, Works and Buildings and their successors under the Crown Lands (Scotland) Acts of 1832, 1833 and 1835. These holdings mainly comprised former ecclesiastical land (following the abolition of the episcopacy in 1689) in Caithness and Orkney, and ancient royal possession in Stirling and Edinburgh, and feudal dues. There was virtually no urban property. Most of the present Scottish estate excepting foreshore and salmon fishing is due to inward investment, including Glenlivet Estate, the largest area of land managed by the Crown Estate in Scotland, purchased in 1937, Applegirth, Fochabers and Whitehill estates, purchased in 1963, 1937 and 1969 respectively.

After winning the 2011 Scottish election, the Scottish National Party (SNP) called for the devolution of the Crown Estate income to Scotland. In response to this demand, the Scotland Office decided against dividing up the Crown Estates, but plans were developed to allocate some of the Crown Estate income to the Big Lottery Fund, which would then distribute funds to coastal communities. Following the 2014 Scottish independence referendum, there were calls for more powers to be devolved from the United Kingdom Parliament to the Scottish Parliament. The Smith Commission was announced by Prime Minister David Cameron, with Lord Smith of Kelvin asked to "convene cross-party talks and facilitate an inclusive engagement process across Scotland to produce, by 30 November 2014, Heads of Agreement with recommendations for further devolution of powers to the Scottish Parliament". On 27 November 2014, the Commission published a number of recommendations, which included that "responsibility for the management of the Crown Estate's economic assets in Scotland, including the Crown Estate's seabed and mineral and fishing rights, and the revenue generated from these assets, [should] be transferred to the Scottish Parliament."

A bill based on the Smith Commission's recommendations became law as the Scotland Act 2016 in March 2016. This made provision for the devolution for the management and revenues of Crown Estate assets in Scotland. Crown Estate Scotland was established by The Crown Estate Scotland (Interim Management) Order 2017. Under The Crown Estate Transfer Scheme 2017, the existing functions of the Crown Estate Commissioners and the rights and liabilities set out in the transfer scheme transferred from the Crown Estate Commissioners to Crown Estate Scotland on 1 April 2017. Prior to the handover, the Crown Estate owned a multi-million stake in the Fort Kinnaird retail park which represented about 60% of the value of all Crown assets in Scotland. This was not passed to Crown Estates Scotland with other Scottish properties in 2016. Two years later, the Crown Estate sold its stake and used the funds to assume full ownership of the Gallagher Retail Park in Cheltenham.

In January 2022 Crown Estate Scotland announced the outcome of the "ScotWind" auction process, where 74 entities applied for rights to offshore wind generation in 17 areas of the seabed (covering a total area of 7,000 km2). The auction raised almost £700m for the Scottish Government, and covers sites estimated to be capable of generating over 24 GW of electricity in total. In April, all 17 winners had signed options. Crown Estate expects that the supply chain industry spends £1.5bn per project.

Assets
Crown Estate Scotland is responsible for managing:
 35,565 hectares of rural land with agricultural tenancies, residential and commercial properties and forestry on four rural estates (Glenlivet, Fochabers, Applegirth and Whitehill)
 Salmon and sea trout fishing rights on many Scottish rivers
 Around half the foreshore around Scotland including 5,800 moorings and some ports and harbours
 Leasing of virtually all seabed out to  covering some 750 fish farming sites and agreements with cables & pipeline operators
 The rights to offshore renewable energy and gas and carbon storage out to 
 Mineral rights over naturally occurring gold and silver across most of Scotland
 Retail and office units at 39-41 George Street Edinburgh 

Similarly, assets that have no owner (bona vacantia) also revert to The Crown, but in Scotland such assets are dealt with by the King's and Lord Treasurer's Remembrancer.

Management and governance
Crown Estate Scotland is a self-financing public corporation of the Scottish Government, i.e. a commercial enterprise under government control. As such it is overseen by a board whose members and chair are appointed by Ministers. Board members are appointed to serve for a two or three-year term, and may not serve for longer than eight years in total. The board appoints a Chief Executive, who is responsible for day-to-day running of the body and is accountable to the board. As of September 2022 the Chief Executive was Ronan O'Hara.

See also
Crown Estate

Notes

External links

Agriculture in Scotland
Companies established in 2002
Crown Estate
Government agencies established in 2017
Public corporations of the Scottish Government
Scottish coast and countryside
Scottish landowners
2017 establishments in Scotland